The Chambers–Robinson House (also known as the Samuel Cooke House) is a historic house located at 910 Montgomery Avenue in Sheffield, Alabama.

Description and history 
The house was built in 1890 by Judson G. Chambers, and sold to Charles and Dora Robinson in 1898. In 1923, the Robinsons' daughter Caroline and her husband Samuel Cooke built a house one block away, and converted the original house to apartments. They sold the new house in 1940, and lived in the original house until their deaths. The Cookes' daughter sold the house in 1962, and it has remained outside the family since. The house was built in Queen Anne style with some Eastlake details. The two-story frame house has a steeply pitched hipped roof supported by decorative brackets and pierced by several dormers. A porch wraps around the left corner of the house, and features elaborate posts, brackets, and latticework. The entry hall features a grand Eastlake staircase.

The house was listed on the Alabama Register of Landmarks and Heritage in 1992, and on the National Register of Historic Places on May 14, 1993.

References

National Register of Historic Places in Colbert County, Alabama
Queen Anne architecture in Alabama
Houses completed in 1890
Houses in Colbert County, Alabama
Houses on the National Register of Historic Places in Alabama